David Applegate is an American academic who has served as director of the United States Geological Survey since 2022. He is also a professor at the University of Utah.

Education 
Applegate earned a Bachelor of Science degree in geology from Yale University and a PhD in geology from the Massachusetts Institute of Technology.

Career 
Applegate is an adjunct full professor at the University of Utah. From 2004 to 2011, he served as senior science advisor for earthquake and geologic hazards at the United States Geological Survey. Since May 2011, he has served as associate director of the USGS for natural hazards.

USGS Nomination
On January 20, 2021, Applegate began serving as acting director of the USGS. On March 8, 2022, President Joe Biden nominated Applegate to serve as director of the agency. Hearings on his nomination were held before the Senate Energy Committee on April 28, 2022. The committee favorably reported his nomination to the Senate floor on June 14, 2022. His nomination was confirmed by the Senate by voice vote. He was sworn in by Interior Secretary Deb Haaland on August 15, 2022.

References 

Living people
Yale College alumni
Massachusetts Institute of Technology School of Science alumni
American geologists
University of Utah faculty
United States Geological Survey personnel
Year of birth missing (living people)
Biden administration personnel